The 2021–22 Howard Bison women's basketball team represented Howard University during the 2021–22 NCAA Division I women's basketball season. The Bison, led by seventh-year head coach Ty Grace, played their home games at Burr Gymnasium in Washington, D.C. as members of the Mid-Eastern Athletic Conference.

They finished the season with a 21–10 overall record, 11–3 in MEAC play to finish in a three-way tie for first place.  As the first seed in the MEAC tournament, they defeated Delaware State, Maryland Eastern Shore, and Norfolk State to win the Championship.  They received an automatic bid to the NCAA tournament, where they were one of the sixteenth seeds in the Greensboro Region.  They defeated Incarnate Word in the First Four before losing to eventual champions South Carolina in the First Round.  The Bison lost 79–21, with their total being a new record for lowest team score in any D-I women's tournament game. The also trailed 44–4 at halftime, with their score also being the lowest in a half in tournament history.

Previous season
The Bison finished the season with a 15–4 overall record, 10–2 in MEAC play to finish in first place in the North Division.  As the first seed in the MEAC tournament, they defeated Norfolk state before losing to North Carolina A&T State in the Final.  They were not invited to the NCAA tournament or the WNIT.

Roster

Schedule

Source:

|-
!colspan=6 style=| Non-Conference Regular season

|-
!colspan=6 style=|MEAC Regular season

|-
!colspan=6 style=| MEAC Tournament

|-
!colspan=6 style=| NCAA tournament

Rankings

The Coaches Poll did not release a Week 2 poll and the AP Poll did not release a poll after the NCAA Tournament.

References

Howard
Howard Bison women's basketball seasons
Howard women's
Howard women's
Howard